Velvina is a village and a community in the municipal unit of Nafpaktos in Nafpaktia, Aetolia-Acarnania, Greece. According to the 2011 census, it had 57 inhabitants.

The village is about 9 km west of Nafpaktos. It is located at the foot of a northeastern foothill of Klokova and is on the right bank of the creek named Varia. In the vicinity toward the south is the ancient city of Molykreio, where an ancient temple is located.

History
Formerly part of the municipality of Nafpaktos, it became part of the community of Moui Agiou Georgiou (renamed to Molykreio in 1919) in 1912. Velvina became an independent community in 1946. It rejoined the municipality of Nafpaktos in 1997, and became part of the municipality of Nafpaktia in 2011.

Historical population

References

External links
Velvina Nafpaktou 
Velvinas Council 
Ancient sources of a temple in Elliniko near Velvina (Ancient Molykreio) 

Foteini Saranti, From Evinos to Mornos (Από τον Εύηνο έως το Μόρνο), p. 393 

Populated places in Aetolia-Acarnania
Nafpaktia